COLB may refer to:
Certificate of Live Birth
coin-operated-locker babies